Ang Lalaki Sa Buhay Ni Selya (English Title: "The Man in Selya's Life") is a controversial 1998 Filipino film about a woman who confronts her own prejudice among the community of intolerant and homophobic gossipers when she chooses between two men.

Synopsis
The story revolves around Selya (Rosanna Roces), a schoolteacher. She wants more commitment from Bobby (Gardo Versoza), with whom she has a sexual relationship, but Bobby refuses to give her what she wants and he leaves her. Selya runs away and ends up in a little town where she meets Piling (Eva Darren), who is also a schoolteacher, and Ramon (Ricky Davao), a closeted gay man. The townspeople are homophobic, and she begins to hear vicious criticisms and unbridled gossip as she embarks on a relationship with Ramon. Selya realizes that things won't end well as Ramon does not want a sexual relationship with her, and she walks out on Ramon even as he proposes to her. Selya goes back to Bobby, only to regret her decision when he gets her pregnant and still doesn't change. Selya then decides to return to Ramon and raise her child with him. Eventually, she becomes happy with her decision to live in a civil union with Ramon, though their relationship remains platonic, and Selya realizes her worth as a woman. In the end, as Bobby tries to take her and their child away from Ramon, Selya confronts her own irony, daringly exhibiting her strength of character as she conquers her physical desires and chooses the more emotionally rewarding bond.

Cast
 Rosanna Roces as Selya
 Ricky Davao as Ramon 
 Gardo Versoza as Bobby
 Allan Paule as Carding
 Eva Darren as Piling
 Crispin Pineda as Imo
 Gigi Locsin as Belen
 Cednic Millado as Abet
 Macky Villalon as Diday
 John Nielsen Apilado as Ramoncito
 Renato del Prado as Ambo
 Virgie Lopez as Diding

Awards

References

External links
 

1998 films
Philippine LGBT-related films
Tagalog-language films
Star Cinema films
Gay-related films
1998 LGBT-related films
Films directed by Carlos Siguion-Reyna